Neotoma leucodon is a species of rodent in the family Cricetidae. Although originally named from San Luis Potosí, Mexico, as a species by Merriam, the white-toothed woodrat was long considered to be a synonym of the white-throated woodrat (Neotoma albigula). Molecular data, however, indicate the populations east of the Rio Grande in New Mexico and Trans-Pecos Texas represent a different species than morphologically similar populations west of the river.

The habitat preferences of the two species appear similar, with woodland to desert habitats preferred. Almost invariably, cacti, especially cholla and prickly pear (Opuntia), are present, and form an integral portion of their diets. In general, the data provided by Macedo and Mares (1988) for what was then thought to be a single species applies to both.

Similar to other woodrats, the white-toothed woodrat gathers sticks and vegetation from its environment to build elaborate dens, which offer protection from predators and from the desert heat.

References

Edwards, C. W., C. F. Fulhorst, and R. D. Bradley. 2001. Molecular phylogenetics of the Neotoma albigula species group: further evidence of a paraphyletic assemblage. Journal of Mammalogy 82:267-279.
Frey, J. K. 2004. Taxonomy and distribution of the mammals of New Mexico: An annotated checklist. Occasional Papers, Museum of Texas Tech University, no. 240:1-32.
Macedo, R. H., and M. A. Mares. 1988. Neotoma albigula. Mammalian Species, no. 310:1-7.
Planz, J. V., G. Zimmerman, T. A. Spradling, and D. R. Akins. 1996. Molecular phylogeny of the Neotoma floridana species group. Journal of Mammalogy 77:519-535.

Neotoma
Mammals of Mexico
Fauna of the Southwestern United States
Mammals described in 1894
Desert fauna
Xerophiles